The Traralgon Football Netball Club is an Australian rules football and netball club based in the city of Traralgon, Victoria. The club currently competes in the Gippsland Football League.

Club history
The first published football match was a game in Traralgon against Warragul in 1883, resulting in a win to Traralgon.

Mr. H West won the club's Best All-Round player in 1884 with 12 votes.

In 1885, Traralgon hosted Essendon Football Club in a game, but were soundly beaten.

Traralgon once again hosted Essendon in 1886, but this time Traralgon (8.12 - 60) defeated Essendon (3.5 - 23).

In 1890, Traralgon FC's home ground was the Recreation Reserve.

After being in recess in 1894, the "new"club was formed in May, 1895, with the club adopting the colours of red and white.

The Traralgon FC and the Rovers FC merged in 1907 to form the Traralgon United FC and played in the West Gippsland Football Association.

In 1911, the club's color's were red and black.

The Traralgon Junior FC was formed in 1918 to provide a form of recreation for the youth of the town. The club colours for 1919 "would be the same as last year, viz, a maroon jersey, white knickers and maroon stockings".

Traralgon also played in the Victorian Football League (VFL) from 1996 to 1997.

Football Competitions Timeline
Gippsland Football Association
1889 to 1890 - (1890 - The Kennedy Cup) 
Robinson's Challenge Cup 
1891
Pettit Challenge Cup
1892 
No competition matches, but did play a number of friendly matches against other local towns.
1893
Traralgon FC in recess
1894
No competition matches, but did play a number of friendly matches against other local towns.
1895 
Traralgon Football Association 
1896 to 1898
Hall’s Trophy
1899 
Traralgon Football Association (Ord Trophy) 
1900 to 1905
 West Gippsland Football Association
1906 to 1907
 ? Football Association
1908
Central Gippsland Football Association
1909 & 1910
Traralgon & District Football Association
1911
Morwell & District Football Association
1912 & 1913
North Gippsland Football Association 
1914 & 1915. 1915 season abandoned in July due to WW1
Club in recess, due to WW1
1916 to 1918
North Gippsland Football Association
1919 & 1920
Gippsland Football League: (GFL) 
1921 to 1935
Central Gippsland Football League: (CGFL) 
1936 to 1940;
Club in recess, World War II
1941 to 1943;
Central Gippsland Wartime Football League
1944 & 1945
Central Gippsland Football League
1946 - 1953
LaTrobe Valley Football League
1954 - 1995 
Victorian Football League: (VFL) 
1996–1997
Gippsland LaTrobe Football League
1996 to 2001
West Gippsland LaTrobe Football League
2002 to 2004
Gippsland Football League
2005 to 2021

Senior Football Premierships
Traralgon Football Association
1900 (Ord Trophy) 
1904 (Tory Trophy) 
Traralgon & District Football Association
1911  (Mrs Kelly’s Trophy)
Morwell & District Football Association
1912
North Gippsland Football Association
1919
Gippsland FL
1923, 1925
Central Gippsland Football League
1946, 1947, 1949
Gippsland Latrobe Valley Football League (GLVFL) 
1960, 1963, 1964, 1965, 1968, 1969, 1972, 1978, 1980, 1987, 1990, 1991,1992, 1994, 1998, 19999, 2000
West Gippsland Latrobe Football League 
2005
Gippsland Football League 
2011, 2015

League Best & Fairest Winners
Senior Football
Gippsland Football League (Trood Award)
1927 - Tom Standing  
1928 - Tom Standing 
1929 - Tom Standing
1930 - Tom Standing 
Central Gippsland Football League (Rodda Medal)
 1938 - Jack Scott 
 1948 - Jack Collins 
Central Gippsland Wartime Football League (Rex Hartley Memorial Medal) 
1944 - Dick King 
LaTrobe Valley Football League (Trood Award / Rodda Medal)
1956 - Noel Alford
1966 - Terry Hunter
1967 - George Brayshaw
1977 - Peter Hall
1984 - Peter Hall
1986 - Jim Silvestro 
1987 - Jim Silvestro
1990 - John McDonald
1992 - Greg Morley
Gippsland LaTrobe Football League
1997 - Neil Robertson
1998 - Greg Morley
West Gippsland LaTrobe Football League
2003 - Greg Morley
Gippsland Football League
2009 - Michael Geary

VFL / AFL Players
The following footballers played with Traralgon FC prior to making their senior VFL / AFL debut.
1897 - David Adamson - South Melbourne
1908 - Ernie Abbott - St. Kilda
1923 - Bill Roberts - South Melbourne
1932 - Jack Anderson - Richmond
1933 - Ray Harry - Carlton
1939 - Jack Scott - Richmond
1940 - Kevin Curran - Hawthorn
1941 - Fred Jones - Hawthorn
1947 - Jack Roberts - Richmond
1950 - Keith McKee - Geelong
1955 - Alan Anton - Fitzroy
1955 - Barry Archbold - Carlton
1957 - Bob Turner - Melbourne
1961 - Max McMahon - Hawthorn
1963 - Paul Harrison - South Melbourne
1966 - Max Thomas - Carlton 
1969 - Bernie Quinlan - Footscray
1972 - Ralph Thomas - Footscray
1974 - Geoff Jennings - Footscray
1974 - Kelvin Templeton - Footscray
1976 - Peter Munro - Footscray
1979 - Neil Cordy - Footscray
1982 - Allan Jennings - Footscray
1981 - Brian Cordy - Footscray
1981 - Rick Kennedy - Footscray
1985 - Graeme Cordy - Footscray
1988 - Adrian Campbell - Footscray
1988 - Jim Silvestro - Sydney Swans
1995 - Craig Biddiscombe - Geelong
2013 - Tim Membrey - Sydney Swans, St. Kilda

The following footballers came to Traralgon FC after playing senior VFL / AFL football, with the year indicating their first season with Traralgon FC. 
1904 - Dr. Tom McLean - Collingwood & Geelong
1925 - Ted Brown - St. Kilda & Carlton
1927 - Jack Sherman - Footscray
1952 - Bill Welsh - Collingwood
1954 - Alf Callick - South Melbourne
1955 - Noel Alford - North Melbourne
1955 - Keith Schaefer - South Melbourne
1975 - Peter Hall - Carlton
1990 - Geoff Cunningham - St. Kilda
1997 - Greg Doyle - St. Kilda & Melbourne
1997 - Geoff Hocking - Carlton
2013 - Brendan Fevola - Calrton
2013 - Nick Stevens - Port Adelaide & Carlton

VFL Seasons
1996
Traralgon's first season in the VFL was unsuccessful. They finished in last place on the VFL ladder, having won only once for the season - defeating North Ballarat in round 4.

1997
Traralgon fared slightly better in their second season in the league, winning three matches for the year, and drawing once. Traralgon's win over Coburg in round 5 was their only victory away from their home ground during their short stint in the VFL.

VFA Honourboard

References

External links
 Traralgon FNC official website
 Gippsland FNL Best & Fairest Winners
 1915 - Traralgon FC team photo
 1922 - Traralgon FC team photo
 1928 - Traralgon FC team photo
 1946 - Central Gippsland FL Premiers: Traralgon FC team photo
 1949 - Central Gippsland FL Premiers: Traralgon FC team photo
 1969 - La Trobe Valley FL Premiers: Traralgon FC team photo

Former Victorian Football League clubs
1883 establishments in Australia
Gippsland Football League
Netball teams in Victoria (Australia)
Traralgon